John James Jepson (born 19 August 1899; died 1987) was an English footballer who played as a forward for Notts County, Accrington Stanley, Carlisle United, Wigan Borough and Mansfield Town.

References

1899 births
1987 deaths
English footballers
Association football forwards
Notts County F.C. players
Accrington Stanley F.C. (1891) players
English Football League players
Carlisle United F.C. players
Wigan Borough F.C. players
Mansfield Town F.C. players